Xeromphalina is a genus of fungi in the family Mycenaceae. The genus has a widespread distribution, and contains about 30 species.

Species

X. amara
X. aspera
X. austroandina
X. brunneola
X. campanella
X. campanelloides
X. cauticinalis
X. cirris
X. cornui
X. curtipes
X. disseminata
X. fraxinophila
X. fulvipes
X. helbergeri
X. javanica
X. junipericola
X. kauffmanii
X. leonina
X. melizea
X. mesopora
X. nubium
X. nudicaulis
X. orickiana
X. picta
X. podocarpi
X. pruinatipes
X. pumanquensis
X. racemosa
X. setulipes
X. tenuipes
X. tropicalis
X. testacea
X. yungensis

References

External links

Mycenaceae
Agaricales genera
Taxa named by René Maire